Charles Richard "Chuck" Strahl  (born February 25, 1957) is a Canadian businessman and politician. He was a Member of Parliament from 1993 to 2011. First elected for the Reform Party, he was the leader of the Democratic Representative Caucus that left the Canadian Alliance in opposition to Stockwell Day's leadership. When the Conservatives won power in 2006, he became a prominent cabinet minister and served as Minister of Agriculture, Indian and Northern Affairs, and Transportation.

On June 14, 2012, Strahl was appointed to serve a five-year term as chair of the Security Intelligence Review Committee, but resigned in controversy over conflict of interest accusations resulting from his lobbying efforts for oil and pipeline companies.

Before politics
Strahl was raised in British Columbia's Interior, attended Trinity Western University, and worked for Cheam Construction, a logging and road-building company owned by his father. Bill Strahl. Chuck Strahl and his siblings took over the business after their father died.

Member of Parliament (1993-2011)

Shortly after the business failed, Strahl ran for office under the Reform Party banner.  He was first elected to office in the Reform Party sweep of the region in the 1993 election. He was re-elected in the 1997 and 2000 elections, running as a member of the Canadian Alliance, which had replaced Reform, in 2000. He represented Chilliwack—Fraser Canyon, a large riding comprising the Upper Fraser Valley, a primarily agricultural area of the province, and the Fraser Canyon-Lillooet-Bridge River regions, which are mostly wilderness with a resource-based economy and also, like the Chilliwack area, have a significant First Nations population. He held a number of shadow cabinet and committee positions.

Strahl rose into national prominence in the summer of 2001 when he was the leader and most outspoken member of a group of Canadian Alliance MPs that left the Alliance caucus and sat as members of the Democratic Representative Caucus.

Strahl's own leadership ambitions were frustrated due to his inability to speak French as well as the lingering distrust among many colleagues over the perceived disloyalty shown to his party in 2001. He attempted to launch a bid for the leadership of the Conservative Party, but was not able to secure enough financial or political support. Strahl then supported Tony Clement in his failed leadership bid.

At the outset of the 38th Parliament of Canada in October 2004, Strahl was appointed Deputy Speaker and Chairman of Committees of the Whole under the new rules brought about as a result of the Liberal minority government situation.

Strahl was appointed Minister of Agriculture and Agri-Food and Minister for the Canadian Wheat Board (CWB) at the beginning of the 39th Parliament on 6 February 2006.  Strahl removed upwards of 16,000 farmers from the voters list in the midst of the 2006 election to the CWB. They were disqualified for such reasons as not having delivered any grain to the Wheat Board in the previous two years or not having produced enough wheat or malt barley to have generated significant enough income from which to subsist.  On 19 December 2006 he dismissed CWB president Adrian Measner, because "It's a position that [he] serves at pleasure. And that position was no longer his" because he displeased the Cabinet.

Strahl was appointed Minister of Indian Affairs and Northern Development and Federal Interlocutor for Métis and Non-Status 
Indians in a cabinet shuffle on 14 August 2007.  He added to his responsibilities the title of Minister of the Canadian Northern Economic Development Agency on 5 February 2010.

Between 6 August 2010 and 18 May 2011, Strahl was Minister of Transport, Infrastructure and Communities.

Health problems
In August 2005, Strahl announced that he had lung cancer as the result of exposure to asbestos many years prior. The illness was diagnosed after one of his lungs collapsed twice.

However, despite his health problems, he successfully ran for re-election in the 2006 election. He later held various positions in the Cabinet such as Minister of Agriculture, Minister of Indian and Northern Affairs, and Minister of Transport, Infrastructure and Communities.

On March 12, 2011, Strahl announced he would not be seeking re-election in the upcoming federal election, which was held on May 2, 2011.

Chair of Security Intelligence Review Committee (2012-2014) Controversy

On June 14, 2012, Strahl was appointed to serve a five-year term as chair of the Security Intelligence Review Committee (SIRC) - Canada's spy agency watchdog. 
In January 2014, he resigned his position as chair after the media revealed that he was a registered lobbyist for the Enbridge Northern Gateway project.

Former Tory MP Deborah Grey, already a SIRC member, was appointed as Stahl's successor by Prime Minister Stephen Harper.

Personal life
Strahl married in 1975 and has four children.

On March 18, 2011, Mark Strahl succeeded his father as nominee for the Conservative Party in the riding of Chilliwack—Fraser Canyon. The nomination process, which is usually four weeks, lasted only a week. Mark Strahl was endorsed by Preston Manning, former leader of the Reform Party of Canada, who said "Mark Strahl -- by virtue of his family background ... is well prepared for service in the House of Commons."

Former Chilliwack city councillor Casey Langbroek said most Conservative Party members from the riding were upset and that the nomination process effectively barred 80% of party members from running. Party member Alex Moens said "High public office should not be like a family business, where it's passed on from father to son."

References

External links
Federal Political Profile from the Library of Parliament
Chuck Strahl's voting record

1957 births
Businesspeople from British Columbia
Canadian businesspeople in timber
Canadian Alliance MPs
Conservative Party of Canada MPs
Canadian evangelicals
Living people
Members of the Christian and Missionary Alliance
Members of the House of Commons of Canada from British Columbia
Members of the King's Privy Council for Canada
People from Chilliwack
People from New Westminster
Reform Party of Canada MPs
Trinity Western University alumni
Members of the 28th Canadian Ministry
20th-century Canadian politicians
21st-century Canadian politicians